Cruzeiro is an administrative region in the Federal District in Brazil.

Created in 1965, Cruzeiro is divided into two broad sections: the original town, Cruzeiro Velho, made up mostly of one- and two-story houses, and the 1970 Cruzeiro Novo, made up of several similar four-story buildings.

History
Cruzeiro was originally conceived as residential area to host public servants from the old capital, Rio de Janeiro whose workplaces would be moved to Brasília, such as clerical workers, firemen, policemen and military officers and their families. Cruzeiro hosts two military areas, one of which contains the Armed Forces Hospital (HFA) and the Urban Military Sector (SMU), a military housing project.

In 1974 and 1989, respectively, the neighborhoods of Octogonal and Sudoeste (SHCSW) were built up inside Cruzeiro. In 2003 they were separated to make up the Federal District's 22nd administrative region, Sudoeste/Octogonal.

Cruzeiro is home to Associação Recreativa Unidos do Cruzeiro (ARUC), Brasília's samba school and is inside Brasília's UNESCO World Heritage Site area.

See also
List of administrative regions of the Federal District

References

External links

 Regional Administration of Cruzeiro website
 Government of the Federal District website

Administrative regions of Federal District (Brazil)